The Mandolin Hills are an isolated group of nunataks which rise  above the ice,  east of Mount Noel, Traverse Mountains, in northwestern Palmer Land, Antarctica. The group was so named by the UK Antarctic Place-Names Committee in 1977 from its shape when viewed in plan suggestive of a mandolin.

References

Nunataks of Palmer Land